is a railway station in the Kyōbashi district of Jōtō-ku and Miyakojima-ku, Osaka, Japan, jointly operated by West Japan Railway Company (JR West), the private railway operator Keihan Railway, and the Osaka Metro.

Lines
JR West

The Tōzai and Gakkentoshi Lines form a combined service line in practice.

Keihan Railway (KH04)
 Keihan Main Line

Osaka Metro
 (N22)

JR West

, Kyobashi was the fourth-busiest station in the JR West network after Osaka Station, Kyoto Station and Tennoji Station.

Layout

Gakkentoshi Line (Katamachi Line) and JR Tōzai Line
There are an island platform and a side platform with two tracks at ground level.

Osaka Loop Line
There are two side platforms with two elevated tracks.

Adjacent stations

History
The station opened on 17 October 1895.

During the bombing of Osaka on August 14, 1945, a one-ton bomb directly struck the Katamachi Line platform and killed 700 to 800 evacuees. Kyobashi was one of the last sites to be bombed in Japan during World War II, followed only by the bombing of Akita, later the same day. A memorial was erected on the site in 1947, and anniversary services have been held at the station every year since 1955.

With the privatization of Japanese National Railways (JNR) on 1 April 1987, the station came under the control of JR West.

The JR Tozai Line opened in 1997, at which point Kyobashi became a terminal for both the Tozai Line and Katamachi Line.

Station numbering was introduced on the JR West lines in March 2018 with the Osaka Loop Line being assigned station number JR-O08 and the Tozai Line being assigned station number JR-H41.

Keihan Railway

Kyobashi is the busiest station in the Keihan network.

This station is the transfer station between the Keihan Line and the Nakanoshima Line. The connections are follows:
eastbound: trains from Nakanoshima ←→ trains from Yodoyabashi
westbound: trains for Nakanoshima ←→ trains for Yodoyabashi

Layout
Two island platforms on the 4th level serve four tracks.

Adjacent stations

History
The Keihan terminal opened on 15 April 1910, originally named . It was renamed Kyōbashi on 1 October 1949, and was rebuilt as an elevated station, completed on 15 April 1970.

Osaka Metro

The Osaka Metro Subway station opened on 20 March 1990 when the Tsurumi-Ryokuchi Line was extended between Kyobashi and Tsurumi-ryokuchi Station.

Layout
An island platform on the 3rd basement fenced with platform gates serves two tracks.

Surrounding area
Keihan Mall
KiKi Kyobashi
Kyobashi Guranshato Building
COMS Garden
Miyakojima Ward office
Osaka Business Park
National Route 1

Buses
Bus services are operated by Osaka City Bus and Kintetsu Bus.

See also
 List of railway stations in Japan

References

External links

Railway stations in Osaka
Osaka Metro stations
Jōtō-ku, Osaka
JR Tōzai Line
Buildings and structures in Japan destroyed during World War II
Railway stations in Japan opened in 1895
Railway stations in Japan opened in 1910
Railway stations in Japan opened in 1990